Michael Neill (born 4 July 1994) is an Australian professional footballer who plays as a left back for Sutherland Sharks in the NPL NSW.

Neill was born in Sydney and played youth football with Sutherland Sharks and Central Coast Mariners Youth before making his professional debut with the Central Coast Mariners and Newcastle Jets in the A-League.

Early life
Neill was born in Sydney.

Club career

Youth
Neill played in the youth systems of English club Portsmouth and Sutherland Sharks before joining the Central Coast Mariners team in the National Youth League.

Central Coast Mariners
After joining the Mariners youth team for the 2012–13 National Youth League, Neill's performances earned him a two-year contract with the senior side. He missed most of the 2013–14 season with injury. In October 2014, Neill made his competitive debut for the Mariners, playing a full match in a 5–0 win over Palm Beach in the FFA Cup. He made his A-League debut for the club in a loss to Perth Glory in November 2014. Late in 2014, Neill suffered an injury which saw him ruled out for the remainder of the 2014–15 season. In February 2015 Neill signed an extension with the Mariners until mid-2017.

Neill netted his maiden A-League goal in a win over Wellington Phoenix on New Year's Eve in 2015.

Sydney United
Neill left Central Coast Mariners in June 2017, joining National Premier Leagues NSW side Sydney United.

Rockdale City Suns
Neill left Sydney United at the end of 2017 season, joining National Premier Leagues NSW side for Rockdale City Suns FC in 2018 NSW NPL season.

Newcastle Jets
In July 2020, Newcastle Jets announced that they had signed Neill for the remainder of the 2019–20 A-League season, following the season's resumption from delays caused by the COVID-19 pandemic in Australia.

Career statistics

See also
 List of Central Coast Mariners FC players

References

External links
 

1994 births
Living people
Association football defenders
Central Coast Mariners FC players
Sydney United 58 FC players
Rockdale Ilinden FC players
Newcastle Jets FC players
A-League Men players
National Premier Leagues players
Soccer players from Sydney
People educated at Endeavour Sports High School
Australian soccer players